Notre-Dame-de-Cenilly is a commune in the Manche department in Normandy in north-western France.

Heraldry

See also
Communes of the Manche department
See also Village Life in Normandy which has details of local events and of the liberation in July 1994

References

Notredamedecenilly
Manche communes articles needing translation from French Wikipedia